Nathan Manning (born January 13, 1982) is a member of the Ohio Senate, representing the 13th district since 2019. Previously he was a member of the Ohio House of Representatives, serving in that body from 2015 to 2018. He is the son of state Representative Gayle Manning and former state Representative Jeffrey Manning.  Manning decided to run for election after to his father's old seat to succeed the term-limited Matt Lundy in 2014. Manning was an assistant prosecutor for the city of North Ridgeville before running for office. Manning is a graduate of Denison University and Capital University Law School. In the general election, Manning defeated his opponent, Democrat Brendan Mackin, 56%-44% to take the seat.

References

External links
Official campaign site

Republican Party members of the Ohio House of Representatives
Denison University alumni
Capital University Law School alumni
People from North Ridgeville, Ohio
American prosecutors
Ohio lawyers
1982 births
Living people
21st-century American politicians
Republican Party Ohio state senators